Walter Maxwell Gibson (1930-2009) was an American chemist.

Gibson was born in Enoch, Utah. He studied at Southern Utah University and the University of Utah. He received his Ph.D. from the University of California, Berkeley where he studied under Glenn T. Seaborg. He worked at Bell Labs where he did studies in ion channeling. He later was head of the physics department and dean of graduate studies at the University at Albany. He would be designated the university's Distinguished Service Professor.

Gibson was a Latter-day Saint. He was for a time bishop of the Albany Ward in New York.

Southern Utah University named its college of Science and Engineering after Gibson. This was in part the result of a $4 million donation by his family in 2012. 
 
Among other works Gibson wrote a book on the radiochemistry of lead.

Sources
Out obituary of Gibson
University at Albany death announcement

1930 births
2009 deaths
People from Enoch, Utah
20th-century American chemists
Southern Utah University alumni
University of Utah alumni
University of California, Berkeley alumni
Fellows of the American Physical Society
American leaders of the Church of Jesus Christ of Latter-day Saints
Latter Day Saints from Utah
Latter Day Saints from New York (state)